Taleghani is a surname which is mostly used in Iran. People with the surname included:

 Abdol Majid Taleqani (1737/8–1771/2), Persian calligrapher 
 Azam Taleghani (1943–2019), Iranian politician and journalist
 Iraj Kalantari Taleghani, Iranian architect
 Khalil Taleghani (1912–1992), Iranian engineer and politician
 Mahmoud Taleghani (1911–1979), Iranian theologian
 Molla Naima Taleghani (died 1738), Iranian Shia philosopher and theologian
 Vahideh Taleghani (born c. 1953), Iranian politician

Persian-language surnames